Abdulrahman Abdulkarim (born 13 May 1980) is a Bahrain football goalkeeper who played for Bahrain in the 2004 Asian Cup. He also played for Al-Najma.

External links

Bahraini footballers
1980 births
Living people
Footballers at the 2002 Asian Games
Al Hala SC players

Association football goalkeepers
Asian Games competitors for Bahrain
2004 AFC Asian Cup players